Allen Turner Cassity (January 12, 1929 in Jackson, Mississippi – July 26, 2009 in Atlanta) was an American poet, playwright, and short story writer.

Life
He was the son of Dorothy and Allen Cassity, and grew up in Jackson and Forest, Mississippi. He graduated from Millsaps College and Stanford University with a master's degree.

Cassity was drafted into the United States Army and stationed in Puerto Rico from 1952 to 1954. He attended Columbia University on the GI Bill. He worked at the Robert W. Woodruff Library at Emory University, from 1962 to 1991, and also taught poetry there.

He is buried in Forest, Mississippi.
His papers are at Emory University.

Awards
 Georgia Author of the Year Award from the Georgia Writers Association.
 Levinson Prize for Poetry, for Devils and Islands
 Michael Braude Award of the American Academy of Arts and Letters
 Ingram Merrill Foundation Award
 National Endowment for the Arts Grant

Works

Verse plays
 Silver Out of Shanghai (1973)
 The Book of Alna (1985)

Anthologies

Criticism

Ploughshares

References

External links
"Turner Cassity Tribute (Guest Features Editor - Suzanne J. Doyle)", Able Muse, December, 2009
"Remembering Turner Cassity (by David Yezzi)", Best American Poetry, August 13, 2009

1929 births
2009 deaths
20th-century American poets
20th-century American male writers
American male poets
Millsaps College alumni
Stanford University alumni
Columbia University School of Library Service alumni
Writers from Jackson, Mississippi
People from Forest, Mississippi
United States Army soldiers